Marine City may refer to:

 Marine City, Michigan, United States
 Marine City, Busan, South Korea